FC Buffalo is an American women's soccer club based in Buffalo, New York, United States. Founded in 2021, the team plays in United Women's Soccer (UWS), a pro-am league at the second tier of the American Soccer Pyramid, in the East Conference. FC Buffalo is the sister club of NPSL club FC Buffalo.

The team plays its home games at Dobson Field on the campus of D'Youville University in the Front Park neighborhood of Buffalo. The team's colors are blue, gold and white.

History 
In 2021, club owner Nicholas Mendola announced the launch of a women's soccer team, which started play in May. On March 5, the club announced Nikki Bartholomew as the first manager of FC Buffalo. In their first UWS season, FC Buffalo finished in first place in the Eastern Conference, with a record of 7-2-1. FC Buffalo hosted the East Conference playoffs, winning their first match against Lancaster Inferno FC 3-2. In the Eastern Conference Final FC Buffalo lost 2-0 against CT Fusion.

On May 9, 2022, the team announced that they would play their home games for the 2022 season at Dobson Field on the campus of D'Youville University while All-High Stadium is renovated. The club again only lost once in the regular season, then winning a pair of playoff games to reach the National Championship weekend.

Players and staff

Current squad

Management and staff

All-time record

Playoff results

Honors

UWS Eastern Conference Regular Season Champions: 2021
UWS Penn-NY Division Champions: 2022
UWS Eastern Conference Champions: 2022

References

 
Association football clubs established in 2021
Sports in Buffalo, New York
2021 establishments in New York (state)
Women's soccer clubs in New York (state)